Adrian Petk (born 12 August 2001) is a Polish professional footballer who plays as midfielder for III liga club Cartusia Kartuzy.

Biography

Early years
Born in the small town of Zelewo, Petk started training with his biggest local team, Gryf Wejherowo, from the age of 9. After being a prolific scorer with Grfy, Petk started training with Gedania 1922 Gdańsk from 2014–2015, before joining the youth teams of Ekstraklasa side Lechia Gdańsk in 2015. From 2015 until 2018 he mostly trained with the Lechia Gdańsk Academy, before joining the Lechia Gdańsk II and occasionally training with the first team for the 2018–2019 season. In his first season with Lechia II he played 23 games scoring 1 goal.

Lechia Gdańsk
In July 2019 at the age of 17 Petk signed his first professional contract, signing a 3 year deal until 2022 with Lechia Gdańsk.

Miedź Legnica
On 10 August 2020, he moved to Miedź Legnica.

References

2001 births
Living people
People from Wejherowo County
Sportspeople from Pomeranian Voivodeship
Polish footballers
Association football midfielders
Lechia Gdańsk players
Lechia Gdańsk II players
Miedź Legnica players
Cartusia Kartuzy players
III liga players